Cyclophora rotundata is a moth in the  family Geometridae. Now the species is treated as Anisodes rotundata (Warren, 1897). It is found on Peninsular Malaysia, Sumatra and Borneo. The habitat consists of lowland forests.

References

Moths described in 1897
Moths of Asia
Cyclophora (moth)